Deportes Temuco is a Chilean football club based in Temuco, Araucanía Region. It currently plays in the Chilean Primera División B, holding home games at the new Estadio Municipal Germán Becker.

The club was founded on February 22, 1960, as Deportes Temuco and again on March 20, 1965, after a merger with Green Cross. Until 1984, the club was known as Green Cross – Temuco, and, in 2007, changed its name to Deportivo Temuco, only on that season.

In 2013, the club merged with Unión Temuco, but the name of Deportes Temuco was kept, along with the logo and traditional white and green colors, making it seem as Deportes Temuco absorbing Unión rather than a fusion. Thanks to the fusion though, Deportes Temuco left the Segunda División and returned to Primera B for season 2013–14, using Unión Temuco's place in that league.

Stadium
Deportes Temuco's current stadium is the Estadio Municipal Germán Becker, a renovated 18,500 football stadium located at the "Pablo Neruda" street in Temuco, leased from Temuco City Municipality since 1965.

Deportes Temuco have also used other grounds during their history;

The Estadio Liceo de Hombres de Temuco, was Deportes Temuco's home from 1963 until the end of the 1964 season.

The club had also played their official home games at the Estadio Municipal de Gorbea & Estadio Municipal de Lautaro when the G. Becker Stadium was re-built, in 2008.

In 2011 due to the poor condition of the  G. Becker Stadium, the club had look again for an alternative stadium to play their home matches; this time D. Temuco played at the Estadio Pueblo Nuevo de Temuco

In 2015 the G. Becker Stadium went on to repairs again, in this occasion, in order to receive the Copa America's games in perfect condition. This time the Estadio Municipal de Villarrica and the Estadio Municipal de Victoria, were the "albi-verdes" choice to play their home matches. They also played one Copa Chile 2015 home game at the Estadio Alberto Larraguibel de Angol.

Honours
Primera B: 3
1991, 2001, 2015–16

Copa Apertura Segunda División: 1
1987

Seasons

1 Participation in Copa Sudamericana (2018)
31 seasons in First Level (Primera División) (1965–1980, 1983–1984, 1992–1998, 2002–2005, 2016/17–2018)
18 seasons in Second Level (Primera B)  (1963–1964, 1981–1982, 1986–1991, 2000–2001, 2006–2007, 2013/14-2015/16, 2019–)
6 seasons in Third Level (Segunda & Tercera)  (2008–2011) & (2012–2013)

South American cups history

^ CONMEBOL awarded San Lorenzo a 3–0 win as a result of D. Temuco fielding an ineligible player. Originally, D. Temuco won the match 1–2.

Records
Record Primera División victory — 8–0 v. Santiago Morning (1969)
Record Primera División defeat — 0–9 v. Palestino (1998)
Record Copa Chile victory — 9–1 v. Fernández Vial (1993)
Most goals scored (Primera División matches) — 50, Víctor González (1969–72, 1974–78)
Most goals scored in a league season (Primera División matches) — 25, Luis Ramos (1978)
Highest home attendance  — 32,551 v. Colo-Colo (3 December 1972)
Primera División Best Position  — 3rd (1969)
Copa Chile Best Season  — Semifinals (1984, 1998)

Current squad

2021 Winter Transfers

In

Out

Managers

Shirt sponsors

List of Kit Manufacturers

Kappa (1987)
Adidas (1990–96)
Diadora (1996–97)
Le Coq Sportif (1998)
Adidas (2000–03)
Training (2004–06)
Kappa (2007)
Lotto (2007–09)
Training (2010)
Joma (2011)
Penalty (2012–13)
Warrior Sports (2013–14)
M11 Sports (2014–16)
Joma (2016–19)
Capelli Sport (2019-20)
KS7 (2020-22)
M11 Sports (2023-)

List of Shirt Sponsors

Herman Gastellu (1978)
Igi-Llaima (1979–80)
El Diario Austral (1981–82)
UFRO (1985)
Doble ZZ (1985–87)
Feria Bernedo (1987)
Ripley (1990)
Cerveza Cristal (1991)
Rosen (1992–94)
Cerveza Cristal (1994–08)
Gejman (2009–10)
Frigorífico Temuco (2011–2013)
Rosen (2013–)

See also
Green Cross

External links
Official website 

Deportes Temuco
Temuco
Temuco
Sport in La Araucanía Region
1960 establishments in Chile